The Copa del Rey 1921 was the 21st staging of the Copa del Rey, the Spanish football cup competition.

The competition started on 9 April 1921, and concluded on 8 May 1921, with the Final, held at the San Mamés in Bilbao, in which Athletic Bilbao lifted the trophy for the eighth time with a 4–1 victory over Athletic Madrid thanks to two braces from José María Laca and Domingo Acedo.

Teams
 Biscay: Athletic de Bilbao
Gipuzkoa: Real Unión
 Centre: Athletic Madrid
 South: Sevilla FC
Galicia: Fortuna Vigo
Asturias: Sporting de Gijón
 Catalonia: FC Barcelona
Levante: Levante de Murcia

Quarterfinals
FC Barcelona withdrew in protest after the Spanish Federation moved the final to Seville: Athletic Madrid, who they had been drawn against, qualified for the semifinals.

First leg

Second leg

Fortuna Vigo and Real Unión won one match each. At that year, the goal difference was not taken into account. A replay match was played.

Athletic Bilbao qualified for the semifinals.

Sevilla FC qualified for the semifinals.

Replay match

Real Unión qualified for the semifinals.

Semifinals

First leg

Second leg

Athletic Madrid qualified for the final.

Sevilla FC won the semifinals, but was disqualified because of an illegal line-up in quarter-finals. Athletic Bilbao qualified for the final.

Final

References

External links
Athletic Bilbao
Linguasport.com
RSSSF

1921
1921 domestic association football cups
Copa